The Gorilla Man is a 1943 American drama film directed by D. Ross Lederman. Despite the title and marketing, it is not a horror film, but a World War II espionage thriller.

Plot 
Military officer Captain Craig Killian is wounded in the line of duty and taken to a private hospital in England. Killian soon learns the hospital is a front of Nazi operations that wish to damage English home defense efforts.

Cast
 John Loder as Captain Craig Killian
 Ruth Ford as Janet Devon
 Marian Hall as Patricia "Pat" Devon
 Richard Fraser as Lieutenant Walter Sibley
 Paul Cavanagh as Dr. Dorn
 Lumsden Hare as General Randall Devon
 John Abbott as Dr. Ferris
 Mary Field as Nurse Kruger
 Rex Williams as Eric, male nurse
 Joan Winfield as Mrs. Ellen Tanner
 Charles Irwin as Police Inspector Cady
 Peggy Carson as Marie Oliver - the Maid
 Walter Tetley as Sammy
 Creighton Hale as Constable Fletcher
 Frank Mayo as Constable Ryan

References

External links
 

1943 films
American drama films
1940s English-language films
American black-and-white films
Films directed by D. Ross Lederman
Warner Bros. films
Films scored by William Lava
Films set in England
1943 drama films
1940s American films
English-language drama films